The 1915 Mid Antrim by-election was held on 17 February 1915.  The by-election was held due to the incumbent Irish Unionist MP, Arthur O'Neill, being killed in action in at Klein Zillebeke ridge during the First Battle of Ypres in the First World War.  It was won by his brother the Irish Unionist candidate Hugh O'Neill, who was elected unopposed.

References

1915 elections in Ireland
1915 elections in the United Kingdom
By-elections to the Parliament of the United Kingdom in County Antrim constituencies
Unopposed by-elections to the Parliament of the United Kingdom (need citation)
20th century in County Antrim